Bagge is a family name of predominantly Scandinavian origin. It may refer to:

Families
Bagge family, Swedish family originating from Marstrand, Bohuslän, 16th century
Bagge baronets, Baronetage of the United Kingdom, created in 1867

Other
Anders Bagge (born 1968) Swedish composer
Gösta Bagge (1882–1951), Swedish economist and politician
Peter Bagge (born 1957), American cartoonist
Selmar Bagge (1823–1896), German composer and music journalist